Buñol is a town and municipality in the province of Valencia, Spain. The municipality has an area of some 112 km², and is situated approximately 38 km west of the provincial and autonomous community capital city, Valencia. It lies along the Buñol River and is surrounded by the mountain ranges La Sierra de Las Cabrillas, la Sierra de Dos Aguas and la Sierra de Malacara y Martés.

The local economic base is a mixture of the industrial and the agricultural (carob trees, almond trees, fruit trees, olive trees and grapes).

Buñol's population is about 9,000 people.

Buñol has regional rail passenger service to Valencia via the Renfe system.

Every year upwards of 40,000 people gather in the town to throw over 115,000 kilograms of tomatoes at each other in the yearly Tomatina festival. The festival is a popular sight and tourists from across Europe flock to the town to join in the fun.

Near the town are the training grounds and facilities of football club Levante UD.

References

External links 

http://www.lahoya.net/pueblos/bunol.htm (Spanish)
Renfe's website.

Municipalities in the Province of Valencia
Hoya de Buñol